101 Central Park West is a residential building on Central Park West, between 70th and 71st Streets, on the Upper West Side of Manhattan in New York City. The apartment building was constructed in 1929 in the Neo-Renaissance style by architects Simon Schwartz & Arthur Gross. It is next to The Majestic between 71st and 72nd Streets and Congregation Shearith Israel on 70th Street.  The building is divided into three blocks which all consist of two elevator banks.  Past and present residents of the building include notable personalities such as Harrison Ford, Rick Moranis, Georgina Bloomberg, Noah Emmerich, and Rabbi Norman Lamm, the former chancellor of Yeshiva University.

It was one of several buildings on Central Park West that was built for Jews who were not welcomed in Manhattan's East Side luxury buildings.

References

Apartment buildings in New York City
Central Park West Historic District
Upper West Side
Residential buildings completed in 1929
Historic district contributing properties in Manhattan
1929 establishments in New York City